State Route 19 (SR 19) is a state highway in the U.S. state of California, running along 
Lakewood Boulevard and Rosemead Boulevard in the Los Angeles area. An additional "hidden" state highway, State Route 164 (SR 164), is also signed as part of SR 19, despite having a legal description separate from Route 19. The combined route is a north–south four-to-six lane suburban roadway, lying east of the Long Beach Freeway (Interstate 710) and west of the San Gabriel River Freeway (Interstate 605), and connecting the eastern parts of Long Beach and Pasadena via the Whittier Narrows. Under their legal descriptions, SR 19 runs north to Gallatin Road in Pico Rivera, then SR 164 goes from Gallatin Road to Pasadena. Since 1998, several pieces have been relinquished to local governments, and more transfers are authorized by state law.

Route description

Locals generally refer to the combined SR 19/164 route as either Lakewood Boulevard or Rosemead Boulevard, not by its numerical designation. The two highways are part of the National Highway System, a network of highways that are considered essential to the country's economy, defense, and mobility by the Federal Highway Administration.

The original official southern terminus of SR 19 was at the Los Alamitos Circle in Long Beach, where Lakewood Boulevard, State Route 1 (Pacific Coast Highway), and Los Coyotes Diagonal converge. SR 19 then proceeded north along Lakewood Boulevard through Long Beach and the City of Lakewood, intersecting with Interstate 405, passing under a runway of the Long Beach Airport (the part through the airport has been relocated to the east; parts of the old alignment remain as airport service roads), then running to the west of Lakewood Center Mall before passing through the neighborhood of Mayfair.

Since the California Legislature relinquished segments of the highway, state control of SR 19 now officially begins at the point where Lakewood Boulevard crosses the Lakewood–Bellflower city limits at Rose Street (SR 19 in Bellflower is also planned to be relinquished by the state). SR 19 then intersects State Route 91 before straddling the city border between Bellflower and Paramount and later Bellflower and Downey. State control of SR 19 then ends north of Gardendale Street when Lakewood Boulevard fully enters into Downey.

Lakewood Boulevard continues north through Downey, intersecting with Interstate 105 before passing by the large site formerly occupied by North American Aviation, Rockwell International and Boeing Reusable Space Systems and interchanging with Interstate 5. At Telegraph Road at the Downey-Pico Rivera city limits, Lakewood Boulevard turns into Rosemead Boulevard. Rosemead Boulevard continues north through Pico Rivera (where this segment of SR 19 has been relinquished to the city as well) to Gallatin Road.

The hidden SR 164, but signed as part of SR 19, begins north of Gallatin Road, traveling along Rosemead Boulevard across Whittier Narrows Dam before entering the Whittier Narrows Recreation Area and intersecting with State Route 60. After this, the road enters South El Monte before crossing the Rio Hondo and straddling the city boundary between Rosemead and El Monte. It then intersects with Interstate 10. This portion of Rosemead Boulevard between Gallatin Road and Interstate 10 is still maintained by the state and built to expressway standards.

State maintenance ends again at the Rosemead–Temple City city limits near Grand Avenue. Rosemead Boulevard then continues north through Temple City and the unincorporated areas of East San Gabriel and East Pasadena and into the City of Pasadena. (The highway was relinquished to Temple City, and those portions in the unincorporated areas were transferred to Los Angeles County.) In Pasadena, the state still maintains the short portion of Rosemead Boulevard from Interstate 210 to Foothill Boulevard, with SR 164's legal northern terminus at the latter. Rosemead Boulevard continues northwest under Pasadena's control from Foothill Boulevard to Sierra Madre Villa Avenue.

Bus service is provided by Metro Local line 266 (between Foothill Boulevard and Del Amo Boulevard) and Long Beach Transit line 111 (south of Del Amo Boulevard) throughout Rosemead Boulevard and Lakewood Boulevard.  The Metro C Line is also provided by a station in the median of Interstate 105 under Lakewood Boulevard.

History

Before the present SR 19 was constructed, San Gabriel Boulevard, which extended from Lamanda Park south to Downey, and was widened and repaved by an assessment tax in 1925, was the main road through the Whittier Narrows, requiring several turns to stay on it and to continue south to Long Beach. The state legislature added Route 168 to the state highway system in 1933, which followed this general alignment between Route 60 (SR 1) in Long Beach and Route 9 (Foothill Boulevard, then US 66) near Lamanda Park. SR 19 was later designated out of the 1964 state highway renumbering.

The 9.56-mile (15.39 km) piece of SR 19 north of Gallatin Road in Pico Rivera has legally been State Route 164 since the 1964 renumbering, but has always been signed as SR 19. Original plans for SR 164 took it southeast to Interstate 605 from the present transition between SR 164 and SR 19, and it was originally planned as the Rio Hondo Freeway.

Many segments of SR 19 have since been relinquished to the cities that they run through. Caltrans relinquished Long Beach's portion of SR 19 to the city on January 27, 1999, and Downey's segment of SR 19 was relinquished to the city on July 3, 2001. However, the segment in Pico Rivera was not relinquished to that city until June 22, 2004. On October 27, 2006, the northern portion of SR 164 that went through an unincorporated area of the county from Callita Street to I-210 was relinquished to the county.  In April 2008, the section of SR 164 through Temple City was relinquished to that city. On April 9, 2012, the section of SR 19 through Lakewood was relinquished to that city. In 2017, the relinquishment process in Bellflower has started.

Major intersections

See also

References

External links

California @ AARoads.com - State Route 19 
Caltrans: Route 19 highway conditions 
California Highways: SR 19

019
Roads in Los Angeles County, California
Streets in Pasadena, California
Streets in the San Gabriel Valley
State Route 019
State Route 19
State Route 19
State Route 19
State Route 19
State Route 19
State Route 19
State Route 19
State Route 19
State Route 19